Beudandite is a secondary mineral occurring in the oxidized zones of polymetallic deposits. It is a lead, iron, arsenate, sulfate with endmember formula: PbFe3(OH)6SO4AsO4.

Beudantite is in a subgroup of the alunite group. It is the arsenate analogue of the phosphate corkite.  Beudantite also forms a solid-solution with segnitite and plumbojarosite.

It crystallizes in the trigonal crystal system and shows a variety of crystal habits including tabular, acute rhombohedral, pseudo-cubic and pseudo-cuboctahedral. 

It occurs in association with carminite, scorodite, mimetite, dussertite, arseniosiderite, pharmacosiderite, olivenite, bayldonite, duftite, anglesite, cerussite and azurite.

Discovery 
Beudantite was first described in 1826 for an occurrence in the Louise Mine, Wied Iron Spar District, Westerwald, Rhineland-Palatinate, Germany. It was named by Armand Lévy after his fellow Frenchman and mineralogist François Sulpice Beudant (1787–1850).

See also
List of minerals
List of minerals named after people

References 

Sulfate minerals
Arsenate minerals
Iron minerals
Lead minerals
Trigonal minerals
Minerals in space group 166
Beudantite group